Hubert Saint-Macary (born 18 May 1949) is a French actor. He is the brother of Xavier Saint-Macary.

Selected filmography

 Un étrange voyage (1981) - L'examinateur
 Stella (1983) - Lomy
 Debout les crabes, la mer monte! (1983) - Le timide
 Dangerous Moves (1984) - Foldes
 Ote-toi de mon soleil (1984) - Hubert
 La femme secrète (1986) - Eric
  (1986) - Chemiker
 May Fools (1990) - Paul
 Mr. and Mrs. Bridge (1990) - Copyist in the Louvre
 Cold Moon (1991) - Un consommateur au bistrot
 Indochine (1992) - Raymond
 L'instinct de l'ange (1993) - Capitaine Georges
 Montparnasse-Pondichéry (1994)
 Casque bleu (1994) - Gianni
 Les Milles (1995) - Locomotive mechanic
 Le journal du séducteur (1996) - Hubert, the Psychiatrist
 The Proprietor (1996) - Paris - Taxi Driver
 Fallait pas!... (1996)
 Genealogies of a Crime (1997) - Verret
 Lucie Aubrac (1997) - Dr. Dugoujon
 Disparus (1998) - L'informateur
 Si je t'aime... prends garde à toi (1998) - Nicolas
 East/West (1999) - Embassy Advisor
 L'ami du jardin (1999) - J.A. Kharavasnapour - le psy
 Crime Scenes (2000) - M. Bourgoin
 Six-Pack (2000) - Charcot
 Most Promising Young Actress (2000) - Loïck
 Ça ira mieux demain (2000) - Eric
 Monsieur Batignole (2002) - Gendarmerie lieutenant
 The Adversary (2002) - Dr. Lantier
 The Bourne Identity (2002) - Morgue Boss
 Sweat (2002) - Grease-Monkey
 Une employée modèle (2002) - Charles
 Toutes les filles sont folles (2003) - Michaux
 En territoire indien (2003) - Le capitaine de gendarmerie
 The Overeater (2003) - Le juge Salabert
 Les amateurs (2003) - Deschamps
 Je suis votre homme (2004) - Le prêtre
 Pour le plaisir (2004) - Marcel
 San Antonio (2004) - M. Chapon
 Man to Man (2005) - Comte de Verchemont
 Boudu (2005) - Bob
 Il ne faut jurer... de rien! (2005) - Le contremaître
 Palais royal! (2005) - Le directeur de la maison de retraite
 Nina's House (2005) - Le chef de gare
 J'ai vu tuer Ben Barka (2005) - Médecin légiste
 Comedy of Power (2006) - Le directeur de la prison
 Hell (2006) - Le père de Sybille
 Gomez vs. Tavarès (2007) - Le ministre
 A Girl Cut in Two (2007) - Bernard Violet
 Paris (2008) - Le cardiologue
 Cash (2008) - Leblanc
 Hero Corp (2008–2017, TV Series)
 Rose et Noir (2009) - L'avocat
 L'enfance du mal (2010) - L'avocat
 600 kilos d'or pur (2010) - Duval
 La croisière (2011) - Le médecin
 Un jour mon père viendra (2012) - Le chef cuisinier
 Parlez-moi de vous (2012) - Directeur Radio France
 I Kissed a Girl (2015) - Le prof d'université
 Through the Air (2015) - Le voisin d'Armand
 C'est beau la vie quand on y pense (2017) - Pierre
 Ami-ami (2018) - Henri, le père de Vincent

External links
 
 Agence Simpson

1949 births
Living people
French male film actors
French male television actors
Actors from Orléans
French male stage actors
20th-century French male actors
21st-century French male actors